Uncial 0317 (in the Gregory-Aland numbering), is a Greek uncial manuscript of the New Testament. Palaeographically it has been assigned to the 7th-century, though it is not sure because text is too brief for certainty.

Description 

The codex contains a small texts of the Gospel of Mark 14:52-53.61-62, on one parchment leaf. The leaf has survived in a fragmentary condition.

The text is written in one column per page, 11 lines per page. 

The Greek text of the codex is too brief too determine its textual character. 

Currently it is dated by the INTF to the 7th-century.

It is currently housed at the Cambridge University Library (Or. 1700).

See also 

 List of New Testament uncials
 Biblical manuscript
 Textual criticism

References

External links 
 "Continuation of the Manuscript List", Institute for New Testament Textual Research, University of Münster. Retrieved September 8, 2009

Greek New Testament uncials
7th-century biblical manuscripts